Shaddox Creek is a  long 3rd order tributary to the Haw River in Chatham County, North Carolina.  Shaddox Creek is the only stream of this name in the United States.

Course
Shaddox Creek rises in a pond about 1 mile northeast of Merry Oaks, North Carolina in Chatham County and then flows west then south to the Haw River about 2 miles southeast of Moncure, North Carolina.  Shaddox Creek is the last tributary to the Haw River before it joins the Deep River to form the Cape Fear River.

Watershed
Shaddox Creek drains  of area, receives about 47.5 in/year of precipitation, and has a topographic wetness index of 451.04 and is about 68% forested.

See also
List of rivers of North Carolina

References

Additional maps

Rivers of North Carolina
Rivers of Chatham County, North Carolina